The Clementi Police Division (or  'D' Division) is one of the seven land divisions of the Singapore Police Force. Clementi Division covers about 70 square kilometres in the South-Western part of Singapore, which includes Jurong Island, Sentosa Island and the popular Holland Village. Nearly half a million people live in the area under Clementi Division, mostly in Tanjong Pagar GRC, West Coast GRC, Hong Kah GRC, Holland -Bukit Panjang GRC, Jurong GRC, and Ayer Rajah Constituency and Bukit Timah Constituency.

History
'D' Division was first formed in 1964 with its headquarters at Queenstown Police Station, Queenstown, which was sited directly across the road from the Police Reserve Unit 2 stationed at Queensway Base. This base also provided accommodations for off-duty single male officers then. Changing demographies and the rapid development of the suburbs resulted in the shifting of the divisional headquarters to its present location in Clementi in 1987.

'D' Division was the first division in which the NPC system was implemented and went on trial. The first such NPC, Queenstown Neighbourhood Police Centre, opened its doors on 1 October 1997 before being officially opened by Mr Wong Kang Seng, Minister for Home Affairs, on 20 December 1997. Operating from a temporary site beside the Queenstown MRT station, it has since moved to a new site co-located with the new fire station of the Singapore Civil Defence Force. The other three NPCs has since moved into permanent buildings, although the Clementi Neighbourhood Police Centre was set up at the existing facilities of the Clementi Police Station now co-located with the division headquarters.

Establishments
Clementi Division HQ
Bukit Merah West Neighbourhood Police Centre
Pasir Panjang Neighbourhood Police Post
Telok Blangah Neighbourhood Police Post
Clementi Neighbourhood Police Centre
Ayer Rajah Neighbourhood Police Post
Clementi Neighbourhood Police Post
West Coast Neighbourhood Police Post
Jurong East Neighbourhood Police Centre
Bukit Timah Neighbourhood Police Post
Queenstown Neighbourhood Police Centre
Alexandra Neighbourhood Police Post
Buona Vista Neighbourhood Police Post
Commonwealth Neighbourhood Police Post
Dover Neighbourhood Police Post

References

External links
Clementi Police Division

Places in Singapore
Clementi
Police divisions in Singapore